Arcy-sur-Cure (literally Arcy on Cure) is a commune in the Yonne department in Bourgogne-Franche-Comté in north-central France.

The caves of Arcy-sur-Cure, just south of the commune, hold the second-oldest cave paintings known, after those of Chauvet Cave. Archeological remains at the Grotte du Renne were taken to provide evidence that Neanderthals had modern human behavior, but this is now doubted.

See also
Communes of the Yonne department

References

Communes of Yonne
Neanderthal sites